Chak Umra is a village and union council, an administrative subdivision, of Chakwal District in the Punjab Province of Pakistan. It is part of Chakwal Tehsil.  There is a Girls' High school in the village, a Maktab Primary and a Primary Schools for boys. Local agriculture involves cultivation of peanuts and different types of vegetables.

Chak Umra union council includes the following villages: Chak Umra, Mian Mair, Farid Kassar, Dhoke Hajian Nadral, Dhoke Wadan,

References

Union councils of Chakwal District
Populated places in Chakwal District